The Mikoyan-Gurevich I-350 (Izdeliye M), was a Soviet Cold War-era experimental fighter aircraft. It was the first Soviet aircraft able to maintain supersonic speed.

Design and development
From 1947, work began on a new axial-flow turbojet by OKB-165, led by Arkhip Mikhailovich Lyulka. OKB Mikoyan-Guryevich designed the I-350 around this engine, the  Lyul'ka TR-3A (redesignated as the Lyulka AL-5). Resembling a scaled-up MiG-17, the I-350 had a long slim fuselage, mid-set 57° swept wings and a wide-chord fin mounting a tailplane at half-span.

Given the OKB designation Izdeliye M, it was the first Soviet fighter able to fly stably at supersonic speeds. Redesignated as the I-350, the I-350M-1 first prototype was fitted with a RP-1 Izumrud airborne interception radar and the second prototype, I-350M-2, was fitted with a Korshun airborne interception radar.

Operational history
The I-350M-1 first flew on 16 June 1951, piloted by Grigoriy A. Sedov, but the engine failed shortly after takeoff, precipitating a hydraulic system failure. Despite battling very heavy control forces, the pilot made a successful landing after lowering the landing gear using the emergency undercarriage extension system. Four more test flights were made, with very poor engine reliability, before the I-350 programme was terminated in August 1951.

Specifications (I-350)

See also

References

External links

I-350
1940s Soviet fighter aircraft
Abandoned military aircraft projects of the Soviet Union
Single-engined jet aircraft
Aircraft first flown in 1951